Mahogany Seed Soup (Ofe Akparata) is a soup made from Mahogany seed traditional known as Akparata among the Igbo tribe. The soup originates from the Eastern part of Nigeria and it is a favourite dish among the Enugu indigenes. The Mahogany seed is widely used as a thickener used in soups and other dishes, besides using it as a thickener it can also be used in making the sauce used in the preparation of Cowleg or Goatleg Nkwobi and Abacha.

Ingredients
 Chicken
 Onions
 Salt
 Stockfish
 Palm Oil
 Dry Fish
 Fresh Pepper
 Crayfish
 Egusi
 Seasoning
 Cow Skin (Pomo)
 Oha (Pterocarpus mildbraedii)
 Mahogany Seed (Akparata)
 Dry Pepper

References 

Nigerian cuisine